Pittosporum heterophyllum, commonly known as Chinese Pittosporum, is a species of plant in the genus Pittosporum. It has long been grown in gardens ornamentally,  especially as a hedge or screen, in temperate gardens for its densely packed green foliage and the fragrant white to yellow flowers it produces in spring. As a landscaping plant, it is known for being more cold hardy than Pittosporum tobira and can be grown in hardiness zones 7-9 on the USDA scale.

References

heterophyllum
Flora of China
Plants described in 1886